The gas laws were developed at the end of the 18th century, when scientists began to realize that relationships between  pressure, volume and temperature of a sample of gas could be obtained which would hold to approximation for all gases.

Boyle's law

In 1662 Robert Boyle studied the relationship between volume and pressure of a gas of fixed amount  at constant temperature. He observed that volume of a given mass of a gas is inversely proportional to its pressure at a constant temperature.
Boyle's law, published in 1662, states that, at constant temperature, the product of the pressure and volume of a given mass of an ideal gas in a closed system is always constant. It can be verified experimentally using a pressure gauge and a variable volume container. It can also be derived from the kinetic theory of gases: if a container, with a fixed number of molecules inside, is reduced in volume, more molecules will strike a given area of the sides of the container per unit time, causing a greater pressure.

A statement of Boyle's law is as follows:

The concept can be represented with these formulae:
, meaning "Volume is inversely proportional to Pressure", or
,  meaning "Pressure is inversely proportional to Volume", or
, or

Charles's law

Charles's law, or the law of volumes, was found in 1787 by Jacques Charles. It states that, for a given mass of an ideal gas at constant pressure, the volume is directly proportional to its absolute temperature, assuming in a closed system.
The statement of Charles's law is as follows:
the volume (V) of a given mass of a gas, at constant pressure (P), is directly proportional to its temperature (T).
As a mathematical equation, Charles's law is written as either:
, or
, or
,

where "V" is the volume of a gas, "T" is the absolute temperature and k2 is a proportionality constant (which is not the same as the proportionality constants in the other equations in this article).

Gay-Lussac's law

Gay-Lussac's law, Amontons' law or the pressure law was found by Joseph Louis Gay-Lussac in 1808. It states that, for a given mass and constant volume of an ideal gas, the pressure exerted on the sides of its container is directly proportional to its absolute temperature.

As a mathematical equation, Gay-Lussac's law is written as either:

, or

, or

,

where P is the pressure, T is the absolute temperature, and k is another proportionality constant.

Avogadro's law

Avogadro's law (hypothesized in 1811) states that at a constant temperature and pressure, the volume occupied by an ideal gas is directly proportional to the number of molecules of the gas present in the container. This gives rise to the molar volume of a gas, which at STP (273.15 K, 1 atm) is about 22.4 L. The relation is given by

, or

where n is equal to the number of molecules of gas (or the number of moles of gas).

Combined and ideal gas laws

The Combined gas law or General Gas Equation is obtained by combining Boyle's Law, Charles's law, and Gay-Lussac's Law. It shows the relationship between the pressure, volume, and temperature for a fixed mass (quantity) of gas:

This can also be written as:

With the addition of Avogadro's law, the combined gas law develops into the ideal gas law:

where
P is pressure
V is volume
n is the number of moles
R is the universal gas constant
T is temperature (K)
The proportionality constant, now named R, is the universal gas constant with a value of 8.3144598 (kPa∙L)/(mol∙K).
An equivalent formulation of this law is:

where
P is the pressure
V is the volume
N is the number of gas molecules
kB is the Boltzmann constant (1.381×10−23J·K−1 in SI units)
T is the temperature (K)

These equations are exact only for an ideal gas, which neglects various intermolecular effects (see real gas). However, the ideal gas law is a good approximation for most gases under moderate pressure and temperature.

This law has the following important consequences:
 If temperature and pressure are kept constant, then the volume of the gas is directly proportional to the number of molecules of gas.
 If the temperature and volume remain constant, then the pressure of the gas changes is directly proportional to the number of molecules of gas present.
 If the number of gas molecules and the temperature remain constant, then the pressure is inversely proportional to the volume.
 If the temperature changes and the number of gas molecules are kept constant, then either pressure or volume (or both) will change in direct proportion to the temperature.

Other gas laws
Graham's law states that the rate at which gas molecules diffuse is inversely proportional to the square root of the gas density at constant temperature. Combined with Avogadro's law (i.e. since equal volumes have equal number of molecules) this is the same as being inversely proportional to the root of the molecular weight.
Dalton's law of partial pressures states that the pressure of a mixture of gases simply is the sum of the partial pressures of the individual components. Dalton's law is as follows:

and all component gases and the mixture are at the same temperature and volume
where Ptotal is the total pressure of the gas mixture
Pi is the partial pressure, or pressure of the component gas at the given volume and temperature.

Amagat's law of partial volumes states that the volume of a mixture of gases (or the volume of the container) simply is the sum of the partial volumes of the individual components. Amagat's law is as follows:

and all component gases and the mixture are at the same temperature and pressure
where Vtotal is the total volume of the gas mixture, or the volume of the container,
Vi is the partial volume, or volume of the component gas at the given pressure and temperature.

Henry's law states that At constant temperature, the amount of a given gas dissolved in a given type and volume of liquid is directly proportional to the partial pressure of that gas in equilibrium with that liquid.

Real gas law formulated by Johannes Diderik van der Waals (1873).

References

External links

 
History of thermodynamics